Comparati is a  of the  of Corciano in the Province of Perugia, Umbria, central Italy. It stands at an elevation of 270 metres above sea level. At the time of the Istat census of 2001 it had 461 inhabitants.

References 

Frazioni of Corciano